San Antero is a town and municipality located in the Córdoba Department, northern Colombia.

References
 Gobernacion de Cordoba - San Antero
 San Antero official website

Municipalities of Córdoba Department